Sushruta, or Suśruta (Sanskrit: सुश्रुत, IAST:) was an ancient Indian physician. The Sushruta Samhita (Sushruta's Compendium), a treatise ascribed to him, is one of the most important surviving ancient treatises on medicine and is considered a foundational text of Ayurveda. The treatise addresses all aspects of general medicine, but the impressive chapters on surgery have led to the false impression that this is its main topic. The translator G. D. Singhal dubbed Suśruta "the father of surgery" on account of these detailed accounts of surgery.

The Compendium of Suśruta locates its author in Varanasi, India.

Date 
The early scholar Rudolf Hoernle proposed that some concepts from the Suśruta-Saṃhitā could be found in the Śatapatha-Brāhmaṇa, which he dates to the 600 BCE. However, during the last century, scholarship on the history of Indian medical literature has advanced substantially, and firm evidence has accumulated that the Suśruta-saṃhitā is a work of several historical layers. Its composition may have begun in the last centuries BCE, completed in its present form by another author who redacted its first five chapters and added the long, final chapter, the "Uttaratantra". It is likely that the Suśruta-saṃhitā was known to the scholar Dṛḍhabala, a contributor to the Charaka Samhita that wrote between the fourth and fifth centuries CE. Additionally, several ancient Indian authors used the name "Suśruta", resulting in potential misattribution.

Citations 
In 1907, an influential translator of the ancient Indian epic The Mahabharata, named Bhishagratna, argued that Suśruta was one of the sons of the ancient sage Vishvamitra. Bhisagratna also asserted that Sushruta was the name of the clan to which Vishvamitra belonged. In Chapter 7 of the five-volume History of Indian Medical Literature, published in 1999, physician-scholar Gerrit Jan Meulenbeld covers a variety of theories on Suśruta's identity and the Sushruta Samhita's publication history.

The name Suśruta is listed as one of ten Himalayan sages in a treatise on medicinal garlic that was included in the sixth century CE Bower Manuscripts.

Followers 
Sushruta attracted a number of disciples who were known as Saushrutas and required to study for six years before beginning hands-on surgical training. Before starting their training, they took a solemn oath to devote themselves to healing and to do no harm to others, often compared to Hippocratic Oath. After the students had been accepted by Sushruta, he would instruct them in surgical procedures by having them practice cutting on vegetables or dead animals to perfect the length and depth of an incision. Once students had proven themselves capable with vegetation, animal corpses, or with soft or rotting wood – and had carefully observed actual procedures on patients – they were then allowed to perform their own surgeries. These students were trained by their master in every aspect of the medical arts, including anatomy.

Sushruta on medicine and physicians 
Sushruta wrote the Sushruta Samhita as an instruction manual for physicians to treat their patients holistically. Disease, he claimed (following the precepts of Charaka), was caused by imbalance in the body, and it was the physician's duty to help others maintain balance or to restore it if it had been lost. To this end, anyone who was engaged in the practice of medicine had to be balanced themselves. Sushruta describes the ideal medical practitioner, focusing on a nurse, in this way:That person alone is fit to nurse, or to attend the bedside of a patient, who is cool-headed and pleasant in his demeanor, does not speak ill of anyone, is strong and attentive to the requirements of the sick, and strictly and indefatigably follows the instructions of the physician. (I.34)

Legacy 

Sushruta's medical prowess is exhibited through his writings on rhinoplasty surgery, involving nasal reconstructions using skin from the patient's forehead or cheek, often for criminals punished with amputations. Based on reports in the October 1794 edition of The Gentleman's Magazine, published in London, Indians maintained Sushruta's surgical practices until the late 18th century.

See also 
 Vagbhata
 Charaka
 Ayurveda

References

External links
 
 Sutrasthana, Nidanasthana, Sharirasthana, Cikitsasthana, Kalpasthana, Uttaratantra: English translation, proofread, correct spelling, interwoven glossary
 The Suśruta Project, a Canadian research project at the University of Alberta aimed at establishing a new Sanskrit text of the Suśrutasaṃhitā based on recently discovered medieval manuscripts in Nepal

Ayurvedacharyas
Indian surgeons
Ancient Indian physicians
Ancient ophthalmologists
Ancient Indian writers
Scientists from Varanasi
Scholars from Varanasi
Writers from Varanasi
8th-century BC Hindus